Hicham Nafil (born 5 June 1975) is a Moroccan former boxer. He competed in the men's bantamweight at the 1996 Summer Olympics and in the light welterweight at the 2004 Summer Olympics.

References

1975 births
Living people
Moroccan male boxers
Olympic boxers of Morocco
Boxers at the 1996 Summer Olympics
Boxers at the 2004 Summer Olympics
Mediterranean Games bronze medalists for Morocco
Mediterranean Games medalists in boxing
Competitors at the 1997 Mediterranean Games
Bantamweight boxers
20th-century Moroccan people
21st-century Moroccan people